Anthidium montanum is a species of bee in the family Megachilidae, the leaf-cutter, carder, or mason bees.

Distribution
It is known from Spain, France, Germany, Switzerland, Austria, Italy, Slovenia, Slovakia, Poland, north-western and southern Russia.

Synonyms
Synonyms for this species include:
Anthidium montanum var flavomaculatum Friese, 1897
Anthidium (Melanoanthidium) montanum Morawitz, 1865 ["1864"]

References

montanum
Insects described in 1864